This article lists the largest companies in Sri Lanka terms of their revenue, net profit and total assets, according to the Colombo Stock Exchange business magazines

2022  list 
This list is based on the Sri Lanka Parliament, which ranks the Sri Lanka's largest public companies.

References 

Public companies
Public companies